The following is a list of the power stations in Nepal.

Hydroelectric

Solar Power Stations

Diesel Power Stations

Hydropower stations under construction

Other Power Stations 

 Solar power stations
 Simikot 50 kW
 Gamgadhi 50 kW
 Dhobighat Oxidaizing Pond 680.4 kW, Owner:KUKL, Dedicated 11 kV feeder connecting to Teku Substation 
 10 other small hydropower stations (total: 2460
 29 small isolated hydropower stations (total: 5.676 MW)

Upcoming Hydro-power Projects in Nepal

Source: Bidhyut Magazine/Semi- Annual Report – NEA, Bhadra 2063; NEA Annual Report 2073 B.S.

See also

List of largest power stations in the world
List of dams and reservoirs in Nepal

References

Nepal
Economy of Nepal-related lists
Energy in Nepal

Power stations